East-West Airlines is the name of two defunct airlines:

EastWest Airlines (Australia) - an Australian virtual airline which commenced services to Griffith NSW in 2019
East-West Airlines (India) - a now defunct Indian airline, India's first privately owned.
East-West Airlines (Australia) - an Australian regional airline which was acquired by Ansett